University College TATI (UC TATI), formerly known as TATI University College and Terengganu Advanced Technical Institute (TATI), is a private university college located in Kemaman, Terengganu, Malaysia

TATIUC is registered with the Ministry of Higher Education and accredited by the Malaysian Qualifications Agency (MQA). It is also a member of the Association of Southeast Asian Institutions of Higher Learning (ASAIHL) and the International Association of Universities (IAU). 

TATIUC offers a range of programs at the diploma, bachelor's, and postgraduate levels. The programs are offered in various fields such as business, management, engineering,

External links 
 TATIUC official site

Kemaman District
Private universities and colleges in Malaysia
Colleges in Malaysia
Universities and colleges in Terengganu
1993 establishments in Malaysia
Educational institutions established in 1993